The Workers' Communist Party of France (PCOF) is a political party of France. The party publishes the monthly newspaper La Forge and is an active participant in the International Conference of Marxist–Leninist Parties and Organizations.

History 
The PCOF was established on 18 March 1979, on the anniversary of Paris Commune, after a split in the Strasbourg section of the Maoist  (PCMLF).  During the Cold War, the PCOF supported the political line of the Party of Labour of Albania. From October 2011 to March 2016, the party was a member of the Front de Gauche.

La Forge gallery

References

External links 
 
 La Forge 

Communist parties in France
Hoxhaist parties
International Conference of Marxist–Leninist Parties and Organizations (Unity & Struggle)
Political parties of the French Fifth Republic
Political parties established in 1979
Far-left politics in France